Crassispira coelata is a species of sea snail, a marine gastropod mollusk in the family Pseudomelatomidae.

Description

Distribution
This marine species occurs off Pacific Panama (Panama Canal Zone)

References

 Hinds, R. B. "On new species of Pleurotoma, Clavatula, and Mangelia." Proceedings of the Zoological society of London. Vol. 11. 1843.

External links
 
 
 James H. McLean & Roy Poorman, A Revised Classification of the Family Turridae, with the Proposal of New Subfamilies, Genera, and Subgenera from the Eastern Pacific; The Veliger  vol. 14, 1971

coelata
Gastropods described in 1843